The Boston mayoral election of 1971 occurred on Tuesday, November 2, 1971, between Mayor Kevin White and United States Representative Louise Day Hicks. This was the second election in a row between White and Hicks. White once again defeated Hicks and was elected to a second term.

The nonpartisan municipal preliminary election was held on September 14, 1971.

Candidates
Louise Day Hicks, member of the United States House of Representatives since 1971. Member of the Boston City Council from 1968 to 1971. Member of the Boston School Committee from 1961 to 1967.
Kevin White, Mayor of Boston since 1968, Massachusetts Secretary of the Commonwealth from 1961 to 1967.

Candidates eliminated in preliminary
Thomas I. Atkins, member of the Boston City Council since 1968.
John E. Powers, Jr.
John L. Saltonstall, Jr., member of the Boston City Council since 1968.
Joseph F. Timilty, member of the Boston City Council since 1968.

Results

See also
List of mayors of Boston, Massachusetts

References

Mayor
Boston mayoral
Boston
Mayoral elections in Boston
Non-partisan elections